The Bled El Hadba mine is a large mine located in Tébessa Province. Bled El Hadba represents one of the largest phosphates reserve in Algeria having estimated reserves of 800 million tonnes of ore grading 15% P2O5.

References 

Phosphate mines in Algeria